Board of Studies "Street Sense" – Road Safety Songs is an Australian children's music album, which was released in 1999 by Franciscus Henri, under ABC Music's (ABC for Kids) on compact disc. It was also issued as part of a kit, Move Ahead with Street Sense, for primary schools by the Roads & Traffic Authority and Board of Studies, which included a "Teacher Resource Booklet". This booklet provides lyrics and sheet music for five of Henri's tracks.

Track listing
 "Click Clack" (Franciscus Henri)
 "Seatbelt Song" (Franciscus Henricus Atheunis)
 "The Footpath Song" (Henri)
 "The Bus Song" (Henri)
 "Silly Billy and Silly Gilly Song" (Henri)
 "Clunk, Click Every Trip" (featuring Jimmy Savile) (Henri)
 "Truckin All Night with My Friend Aaron" (Henri)

References

1999 albums
Franciscus Henri albums